Gavin Bantock (born 4 July 1939) is an English poet; he is the grandson of Granville Bantock. He was born in Barnt Green, and attended New College, Oxford, where he won the Richard Hillary prize for poetry. He traveled to Japan in 1964 on the advice of his father, Raymond, and returned five years later to teach at Reitaku University. He has remained in the country ever since. Initially teaching English language and literature at Reitaku, he began also leading a group of students in productions of English plays, which eventually became his primary career. After retiring from Reitaku in 1994, he became the drama coach at Meitoku Gijuku High School in Kochi.

Many of Bantock's poems treat elements of Christianity, history, mythology, or medieval and Renaissance literature in arresting, often disturbing terms. His book-length poem "Christ," first published in 1965 and issued in a revised edition in 2020, is skeptical of "any idea of an innate and preordained divinity in an incarnate Christ," according to Adrian A. Husain's introduction to the revised edition. His poems "Joy" and "Dirge" were included by Philip Larkin in The Oxford Book of Twentieth Century English Verse. John Matthias included excerpts from Bantock's "Hiroshima," which Matthias calls "terrifying," in the collection 23 Modern British Poets.

Selected books
Christ: A Poem in Twenty-Six Parts. Oxford: D. Parsons, 1965. 
Juggernaut. Northwood: Anvil Press Poetry, 1968. 
A New Thing Breathing. Northwood: Anvil Press Poetry, 1969. 
Anhaga. London: Anvil Press Poetry, 1972. 
Eirenikon: A Poem. London: Anvil Press Poetry, 1972. 
Isles. Feltham: Quarto Press, 1974. 
Dragons. London: Anvil Press Poetry, 1979. 
Just Think of It. London: Anvil Press Poetry, 2002. 
SeaManShip. Manchester: Carcanet, 2003. 
Christos, Lovesong of the Son of Man: A Poem in Twenty-Six Parts. (Revision of 1965 work) First Servant Books, 2020.
Hail, Salubrious Spot! (How's Your Rupture): Memories of a Worcestershire Village. First Servant Books, 2020. 
Thys Felyship: Oxford Days Around 1960, A Memoir. First Servant Books, 2021 
Shakespeare for Student Actors [First Servant Shakespeare Edition in 35 vols.] First Servant Books, 2022. 
Playhouse, A Theatrical Cavalcade, Sixty New Poems First Servant Books, 2022

References

1939 births
Living people
20th-century English poets
English expatriates in Japan